The Ministry of Public Security (MPS) is a public agency directly under the Government of Vietnam, performing the function of state management of security, order and social safety; counterintelligence; crime prevention investigation; fire prevention and rescue; execution of criminal judgments, judgment enforcement not subject to imprisonment, custody or temporary detention; legal protection and support; State management of public services in sectors and fields under the Ministry's state management.

The Ministry of Public Security is the agency that manages the Vietnam People's Public Security.

General To Lam is the current head of the Vietnamese MPS.

History
The foundation of the MPS started on August 19, 1945 when the Indochinese Communist Party formed three departments, consisting of the Security Service Bureau in Northern Vietnam, the Surveillance Service in central Vietnam and the National Self-Defense Force Bureau in southern Vietnam. The three departments provided protection for Ho Chi Minh and other CPV leaders in time for September 2, 1945 when independence was declared for the Democratic Republic of Vietnam. On February 21, 1945, Ho signed Decree 23, which unified the three bureaus into the Vietnam People’s Police Department under the Ministry of Internal Affairs. Le Gian served as the first head of the MIA.

The Sub-Ministry of Public Security was established in February 1953 when it was under North Vietnamese control after Ho signed Decree 141/SL. At the time of establishment, it formally had seven departments and divisions. After the Government Council was presided from August 27 to 29 of 1953, the Sub-Ministry was updated to the Ministry of Public Security.

In 1957, it first made official connections to the Stasi, the secret police of the German Democratic Republic. From 1972, Stasi head Erich Mielke provided technical assistance to the MPS in improving its intelligence and surveillance state  operations throughout Vietnam, particularly after selected MPS personnel were sent to East Germany for further training.

On June 12, 1981, Decree 250/CP was signed, which defined the mandate of the Ministry of Interior. The Interior Minister then signed Decision 12-QD/BNV to prescribe the powers of the General Department of Police (GDP) with 12 subordinate units.

The Ministry of Public Security received many titles such as Hero of the People's Armed Forces 13 times, Gold Star Order (Vietnam) and 88 Ho Chi Minh Orders.

Controversies
 Following the Fall of Saigon, the MPS imprisoned at least 200,000 to 300,000 former South Vietnamese military officers, government employees, and supporters of the former government of South Vietnam in re-education camps, where both physical torture and mental abuse were common. The MPS has also played a role in ongoing religious persecution, surveillance and persecution of dissident poets, writers, and political prisoners, and in the ongoing efforts to repress the Vietnamese democracy movement, especially since the 2006 foundation of Bloc 8406. For example, lawyer and labor union activist Trần Quốc Hiền was sentenced in 2007 to five years imprisonment for "endangering state security", membership in Bloc 8406, and writing online articles titled, "The Tail", which critically described life under MPS surveillance.

Structure
The MPS is structured according to the following as of 2018:
 Office of the Ministry of Public Security (V01)
 Department of Foreign Affairs (V02)
Department of Legal Affairs and Judicial Reform (V03)
 Department of Science, Strategy and History of the Public Security (V04)
 Department of Construction of the all-people movement to protect national security (V05)
 Department of Professional Records (V06)
Department of Foreign Security (A01)
 Department of Homeland Security (A02)
Department of Internal Political Security (A03)
 Department of Economic Security (A04)
Department of Cybersecurity and High-Tech Crime Prevention and Control (A05)
 Department of Professional Technology (A06)
 Offline Department (A07)
 Administration of Immigration (A08)
Bureau of Investigation Security (A09)
Department of Information Processing and Intelligence Support (B01)
Asia Intelligence Bureau (B02)
US, Europe, Africa Intelligence Service (B03)
Bureau of Secret Intelligence (B04)
Bureau of Economic, Scientific, Technical and Environmental Intelligence (B05)
 Department of Organization and Personnel (X01)
 Training Department (X02)
 Department of Party and Political Work (X03)
 Communication Department of the People's Public Security (X04)
 Inspector of the Ministry of Public Security (X05)
 Central Public Security Party Committee Inspection Committee Organ (X06)
Office of the Police Investigation Agency (C01)
Criminal Police Department (C02)
The Police Department investigates crimes related to corruption, economy, and smuggling (C03)
Police Department investigating drug crimes (C04)
Environmental Crime Prevention Police Department (C05)
Police Department for administrative management of social order (C06)
Police Department of Fire Prevention and Rescue (C07)
Traffic Police Department (C08)
The Police Department manages prisons, compulsory education institutions, reform schoo (C10)
The Police Department manages custody, temporary detention and criminal judgment execution in the community (C11)
Department of Planning and Finance (H01)
Department of Equipment and Logistics (H03)
Department of Construction Management and Barracks (H02)
Department of Telecommunications and Cipher (H04)
Information Technology Department (H05)
Department of Health (H06)
Logistics Department (H07)
Security Industry Bureau (H08)
Guards Command (K01)- (It is equivalent to the General Department level with the task of protecting key people and state-level officials)
Mobile Police Command (K02)- (it is equivalent to General Department level)
International Academy (B06)
People's security Academy (T01)
People's Police Academy (T02)
Political Academy of the People's Public Security (T03)
University of People's Security (T04)
People's Police University (T05)
University of Fire Prevention (T06)
University of Technology - Logistics People's Public Security (T07)
People's Security College I (T08)
People's Police College I (T09)
People's Police College II (T10)
Institute of Criminal Science (C09)
Institute of science and technology (H09)
Hospital 19-8
Hospital 30-4
Hospital 199
Traditional medicine Hospital

References

Public Security
Law enforcement in Vietnam
Vietnam
Political repression in Vietnam